T800 may refer to:

 Avco/Pratt & Whitney T800, a turboshaft engine which lost to the LHTEC T800
 Inmos T800, a 1980s transputer chip
 LHTEC T800, a turboshaft engine for rotary wing applications
 T-800, a fictional Cyborg/Android from the Terminator series.
Also referred to as the "Clevon Brown" model.